The PNVF Champions League (PNVFCL) is a volleyball competition organized by the Philippine National Volleyball Federation (PNVF), the national sports association for volleyball in the Philippines.

Background
Shortly after the International Volleyball Federation (FIVB) gave full recognition for the Philippine National Volleyball Federation (PNVF) as the national sports association for volleyball in the Philippines in February 2021, the PNVF announced plans to organize its own league, separate from the two existing commercial leagues, the Premier Volleyball League and the Philippine Super Liga. The Philippines have several other volleyball leagues, such as the UAAP collegiate leagues but none was officially recognized as the "national league".

The PNVF announce that it would be organizing the first men's competition from September 19 to 26, 2021 under a bubble format. The PNVF announced plans to hold an inaugural season of a men's league in September 2021. In September 2021, it was announced that the PNVF Champions League would be held in November instead. A women's competition would also be held in the same month. A beach volleyball tournament for both men and women would also be held in December 2021.

The second season of the PNVF CL is set to commence in November 2022.

Results summary

Men's tournament

Women's tournament

References

2021 establishments in the Philippines
Sports leagues established in 2021
2021 in Philippine sport
 
Volleyball competitions in the Philippines